Kate Allsop is a British local politician who was the directly elected mayoress of Mansfield from 2015 until the 2019 election when she was beaten by Labour candidate Andy Abrahams by two votes.

She first stood for the post in 2002 as a member of the Conservative Party. Allsop left the Conservative party in 2003 to become an "Independent Conservative", describing herself in the local newspaper as "true blue", remaining as president of Mansfield's Conservative Association.

She later joined the Mansfield Independent Forum and was elected as a councillor in 2011.

She succeeded Tony Egginton as mayor after beating the Labour party candidate in the 2015 Mayoral election. Her campaign was afterwards subjected to a Police investigation after allegations were made regarding potential breaches of electoral law, involving spending more on campaigning than the permitted maximum of £6,969.72. The Crown Prosecution Service's lawyer subsequently confirmed the probe had been dropped due to "...insufficient evidence to provide a realistic prospect of conviction.".

As Mayor of Mansfield, she was in control of the Mansfield District.

Following her tenure as mayor she briefly served as an adviser to Merthyr Tydfil council before the agreement of £300 per day plus expenses was terminated when, abruptly, she publicly announced her intention to be the Brexit Party's parliamentary candidate in Mansfield.

Allsop had been recruited as an experienced Independent former local bureaucrat "...to develop and strengthen working relationships across all political groups and between members and officers.". Following Allsop's announcement to stand as an MP without notifying her employer (the Welsh devolved government), her 'independent' status was fundamentally changed and compromised the basis on which she had been selected, by becoming prominently engaged in national political activity.

Welsh Government minister Julie James stated it would be "inappropriate" for Allsop to continue in the role as an independent adviser.

Allsop learned on 11 November of Brexit Party supremo Nigel Farage's decision to withdraw their parliamentary candidates in the 12 December 2019 general election from 317 areas having a sitting conservative MP – including Mansfield, where Allsop had planned to stand since before losing her job as an adviser to Merthyr council in August.

References

Living people
Year of birth missing (living people)
Mayors of places in Nottinghamshire
People from Mansfield
Conservative Party (UK) mayors
Reform UK politicians
Women mayors of places in England